The State Treasurer of Michigan functions as the chief financial officer for the U.S. state of Michigan. The State Treasurer oversees the collection, investment, and disbursement of all state monies, and also administers major tax laws, safeguards the credit of the state, and distributes revenue sharing monies to local units of government.  It is an unelected office within the executive branch.

The current state treasurer is Rachael A. Eubanks, who was appointed by Governor Gretchen Whitmer in January 2019.

List of State Treasurers of Michigan

Notes
Citations

Bibliography
Source: Michigan Manual 2003-2004, Chapter IV, Former Officials of Michigan

External links
Michigan Department of Treasury